Purnea University is a collegiate public state university located in Purnia, Bihar, India. It has jurisdiction over Purnia, Araria, Kishanganj and Katihar districts. It was established by an act of State Legislature in 2018. As a collegiate university, its main functions are divided between the academic departments of the university and affiliated colleges.

The Governor of Bihar serves as the university's chancellor.

History
Purnea University was established on 18 March 2018 after its bifurcation from Bhupendra Narayan Mandal University, Madhepura. The first academic year of the university was scheduled to be 2018–19.

Campus 

At present the University runs in the campus of Purnea College Purnea  but very soon it will have its own campus in about 37.24 acres of Land in which offices, Residence, Sports & Cultural spaces, Academic & Administrative block, Conference hall, Examination hall, Library, Laboratories, Guest house, University health care center, Hostels, Canteen, Yoga and Dhyan kendra, Information and Communication system (ICS), Training & placement cell, International affairs cell and all other basic amenities will be available. Purnea University is trying to develop a good campus promoting the energy and environment substance by creating a clean and green campus. Purnea University is growing as a centre of multidisciplinary education that offers a wide range of academic programs starting from Graduation, Post-Graduation and Phd.

Academic programmes
The programmes offered at the university are identical to those offered at Bhupendra Narayan Mandal University such as bachelor courses in humanities B.A., B.Sc., B.Com. and also Professional Courses such as bachelor of technology in Civil Engineering, Electrical Engineering, Mechanical Engineering, Electronics Engineering and Computer Science and Engineering, M.A. in Humanities, MBA.

Colleges 
Its jurisdiction extends over four districts, Araria, Katihar, Kishanganj and Purnea.

Affiliated colleges
	S.N.S.Y. Degree College, Rambagh, Purnia
	N.D. College, Rambagh, Purnia 
	R.K.K. College, Purnia
	P.S. College, Harda, Purnia
	B.N.C. College, Dhamdaha, Purnia
	A.J. Mahila College, Banmankhi, Purnia
	S.R.C Degree College, Katihar
	R.Y. Degree College, Manihari, Katihar
	B.M. Degree College, Barari, Katihar
	Balrampur Degree College, Balrampur, Katihar
	B.D. College, Barsoi, Katihar
	Y.N.P. Degree College, Raniganj, Araria
	K.D. College, Raniganj, Araria
	J.D.S.S. Mahila College, Forbesganj, Araria
	M.L.D.P.K.Y. College, Araria
	Alsams Millia Degree College, Araria
	Peoples College, Araria
	R.K.S. Mahila College, Kishanganj
	M.H.A.N.D. College, Thakurganj, Kishanganj

Constituent colleges
	Purnea College, Purnia
	Purnea Mahila Mahavidyalya, Purnia
	M.L. Arya College Kasba, Purnia
	G.L.M. College, Banmankhi, Purnia
	R.L. College, Madhavnagar, Purnia
	D.S. College, Katihar
	MJ.M. Mahila College, Katihar
	RDS College, Salmari, Katihar 
	KB Jha College, Katihar
	Forbesganj College, Forbesganj, Araria 
	Araria College, Araria
	Marwari College, Kishanganj
	Nehru College, Bahadurganj, Kishanganj
	Govt degree college, Baisi, Purnea 
	Govt degree college, Dhamda, Purnea

Law colleges
 Brij Mohan Thakur Law College, Purnia
 Chandra Kishore Mishra Law College, Araria 
 Surya Dev Law College, Katihar

Student Politics and Union

 Suraj Verma, Student Leader, ABVP 
 Rajesh Yadav, Ex-Student Leader, Independent 
 Nupur Shubhangi, President 
 Priti Kumari, Vice-President
 Sanchit Vadwani, General Secretary
 Angel Kumar, Joint Secretary
 Ashutosh Kumar Jha, Treasurer

References

 
Universities in Bihar
Purnia
Educational institutions established in 2018
2018 establishments in Bihar